, was a Japanese statesman during the early Meiji period. He was Governor of Tokyo in 1868 and a member of the Japanese Privy Council in 1889.

Biography 

Ōki was born into a samurai family in Saga, in Hizen province (present-day Saga prefecture). He studied at the domain school Kodokan, and promoted reform of the domain administration. During the Boshin War he was a leader in the Saga forces committed to the overthrow of the Tokugawa shogunate.

After the Meiji Restoration, he supervised the transfer of the imperial capital from Kyoto to Tokyo, and was appointed the first Governor of Tokyo.

In 1871, he became Education Minister and is credited with establishing Japan's modern educational system. In 1873, he became sangi (councillor) and in 1876, Justice Minister and was concerned with the punishment of the disgruntled ex-samurai involved in the Hagi Rebellion and the Shimpūren Rebellion. In 1880, he became chairman of the Genrōin . He also worked on developing Japan's civil code as the president of the ‘Civil Code Compiling Council’.

In 1884, he was elevated to the title of hakushaku (count) in the new kazoku peerage system.

From 1888 he served on the Privy Council, becoming chairman in 1889. Later he was appointed Justice Minister under the first Yamagata administration, and the Education Minister under the first Matsukata administration.

His eldest son, Ōki Enkichi was also a politician, and a cabinet member during the Taishō period.

Notes

References 
 

 OCLC 579232
   OCLC 12311985
 OCLC 46731178
   OCLC 58053128
 ;  OCLC 427566169

External links 

 National Diet Library Photo & Bio

1832 births
1899 deaths
People from Saga (city)
Kazoku
People of Meiji-period Japan
Nabeshima retainers
Ministers of Justice of Japan
Education ministers of Japan